Horrabad-e Sofla (also Romanized as Ḩorrābād-e Soflá) is a village in Pishkuh-e Zalaqi Rural District, Besharat District, Aligudarz County, Lorestan Province, Iran. At the 2006 census, its population was 184, in 37 families.

References 

Towns and villages in Aligudarz County